NGC 6053 is an elliptical galaxy located about 450 million light-years away in the constellation Hercules. The galaxy was discovered by astronomer Lewis Swift on June 8, 1886 and is member of the Hercules Cluster.

See also
 List of NGC objects (6001–7000)

References

External links

 http://ngcicproject.org/NGC/NGC_60xx/NGC_6057.htm 
 http://www.astronomy-mall.com/Adventures.In.Deep.Space/NGC%206000%20-%206999%20(11-30-17).htm

6053
57090
Hercules (constellation)
Hercules Cluster
Astronomical objects discovered in 1886
Elliptical galaxies